Henry William Hoffman (May 16, 1925 – September 12, 2009) was an American writer who published thirteen novels and four books of short stories and two plays. He was born in West Virginia but spent his formative years in southwestern Virginia.

William Hoffman was the recipient of the 1992 John Dos Passos Prize. In 1996 he was awarded the O. Henry Prize, and in 1999 he received the Dashiell Hammett Award for the book Tidewater Blood.  His short story "Dancer," published in The Sewanee Review, won the 1989 Andrew Lytle Prize. He wrote mysteries towards the end of his career. His first novel, The Trumpet Unblown, reflected his horrific experiences as a medic in World War II.

Novels
 The Trumpet Unblown (1955)
 Days in the Yellow Leaf (1958)
 A Place for My Head (1960)
 The Dark Mountains (1963)
 Yancey's War (1966)
 A Walk to the River (1970)
 A Death of Dreams (1973)
 The Land That Drank the Rain (1982)
 Godfires (1985)
 Furors Die (1990)
 Tidewater Blood (1998)
 Blood and Guile (2000)
 Wild Thorn (2002)
 Lies (2005)

Short stories

 Virginia Reels (1978)
 By Land, By Sea (1988)
 Follow Me Home (1994)
 Doors (1999)

References

Further reading
 Frank, William, ed. The Fictional World of William Hoffman. Columbia, Missouri: University of Missouri Press, 2000.

External links
 Entry in Encyclopedia Virginia
 Biography from West Virginia Wesleyan College Library
  Photo and brief from Harper Collins

Hampden–Sydney College alumni
20th-century American novelists
21st-century American novelists
American male novelists
1925 births
2009 deaths
American male short story writers
People from Charlotte County, Virginia
Writers from Charleston, West Virginia
Novelists from Virginia
20th-century American short story writers
21st-century American short story writers
20th-century American male writers
21st-century American male writers
Novelists from West Virginia